The Sudden Loneliness of Konrad Steiner is a 1976 Swiss drama film directed by Kurt Gloor. It was entered into the 26th Berlin International Film Festival.

Cast
In alphabetical order
 Ettore Cella
 Helmut Förnbacher
 Helene Friedli
 Silvia Jost
 Alfred Rasser
 Sigfrit Steiner

References

External links

1976 films
Swiss German-language films
1976 drama films
Films directed by Kurt Gloor
Swiss drama films